Svend Tronkræver or Svend Svendsen (died 1104) was a Danish prince, one of the illegitimate sons of king Sweyn II of Denmark. He shared the same name with his brother Sweyn the Crusader and another brother.

When his brother Eric Evergood died in July 1103 during a pilgrimage, Svend tried to become the next King of Denmark. On the way to the royal elections at Viborg, he became ill. Not wanting any rivals to get there ahead of him, he continued the journey anyway, but died of hardships. Instead, his younger brother Niels, the last surviving son of King Sweyn II, was elected king the following year.

He was the father of Henrik Skadelår and grandfather of King Magnus II of Sweden.

Year of birth unknown
1104 deaths
Danish princes
Illegitimate children of Sweyn II
11th-century Danish people
12th-century Danish people
Sons of kings